Minduri is a municipality in the state of Minas Gerais in the Southeast region of Brazil.

Geography 
According to IBGE (2017), the municipality is in the Immediate Geographic Region of Caxambu-Baependi, in the Intermediate Geographic Region of Pouso Alegre.

Ecclesiastical circumscription 
The municipality is part of the Roman Catholic Diocese of São João del-Rei.

See also
List of municipalities in Minas Gerais

References

Municipalities in Minas Gerais